John Cranston may refer to:

John Cranston (governor) (1625–1680), colonial governor of Rhode Island
John Cranston (American football) (1865–1931), American football player and coach
John Arnold Cranston (1891–1972), Scottish research chemist
John Cranston (priest) Archdeacon of Clogher from 1718 until 1762